Marcos Soares may refer to:

 Marcos Soares (sailor) (born 1961), Brazilian sailor
 Marcos Soares (footballer) (born 1975), Brazilian football manager and former footballer

See also
 Marco Soares (disambiguation)